Eric Austin (born 5 April 1974) is a New Zealand cricketer. He played in seven first-class and five List A matches for Central Districts from 1995 to 1997.

See also
 List of Central Districts representative cricketers

References

External links
 

1974 births
Living people
New Zealand cricketers
Central Districts cricketers
Cricketers from Whanganui